Ketchum is a surname that originated in England.

Notable people with the surname include:

 Annie Chambers Ketchum (1824–1904; (religious name, Sister Amabilis), American educator, lecturer, writer
 Daniel Ketchum (born 1981), former American swimmer
 Gerald Ketchum (1908–1992), commanded the icebreaker USS Burton Island (AG-88)
 Gus Ketchum (1897–1980), American Major League Baseball pitcher
 Hal Ketchum (1953–2020), American country music singer-songwriter
 Henry Ketchum (1839–1886), Canadian engineer
 Jack Ketchum (1946–2018), American horror writer
 James S. Ketchum (1931–2019), American psychiatrist
 Jesse Ketchum (1782–1867), tanner and political figure in Upper Canada
 Menis E. Ketchum, Chief Justice of the Supreme Court of Appeals of West Virginia
 Morris Ketchum (1796–1880), American banker and financier of the 19th century
 Richard Ketchum (1773–1845), political figure in New Brunswick
 Robert Glenn Ketchum (born 1947), landscape and nature photographer
 Tom Ketchum (1863–1901), a.k.a. "Black Jack" Ketchum, U.S. Western outlaw
 Wesley Harrington Ketchum (1878–1968), medical doctor, introduced Edgar Cayce to the national medical community in a 1910 presentation to the American Association for Clinical Research 
 William Ketchum (mayor), mayor of the City of Buffalo, New York
 William M. Ketchum (1921–1978), U.S. Representative
 William Scott Ketchum (1813–1871), U. S. Army officer before and during the American Civil War

Fictional characters:
 Ash Ketchum, a fictional Pokémon Trainer figure
 Delia Ketchum, his mother
 Kevin Ketchum, an OZ prisoner

English-language surnames
Surnames of English origin